Bric Agnellino is a mountain in Liguria, northern Italy, part of the Ligurian Prealps.

Geography 
Bric Agnellino is located west of Colle di Cadibona in the province of Savona. It has an elevation of 1,335 metres. The mountain is the tripoint where the comuni of Magliolo, Giustenice and Bardineto meet.

Climbing 
From some year is available a via ferrata named Ferrata degli Artisti that follows the Balzi Rossi ridge (from the reddish rocks dominating there.

References

Mountains of the Ligurian Alps
Mountains of Liguria
Agnellino